Cytochrome P450 family 109 subfamily B member 1 (abbreviated CYP109B1) is a versatile prokaryote monooxygenase originally from Bacillus subtilis, its three-dimensional protein crystal structure has been solved.

References 

Cytochrome P450
Prokaryote genes